The Calgary Folk Music Festival (also known as "Calgary Folk Fest") is held in late July each year at Prince's Island Park, Calgary, Alberta, Canada. July 2022 is the Festival's 43rd edition. The four-day Calgary Folk Music Festival annually features 70 icons and upstarts from 16 countries on 11 stages in over 100 distinct concert and collaborative programming performances to a 52,000+ audience the 4th weekend of July at Prince's Island Park. A genre-bending affair, it features roots, funk, country, old-time, world and indie icons and upstarts from around the globe. Ever-evolving programming brings on-the-fly collaborations where musical arranged marriages spark one-time works of art.

The 44th annual Calgary Folk Music Festival will take place July 27-30, 2023.

Workshops
A popular feature of the Calgary Folk Music Festival is the inclusion of workshops into its programming. Workshops take place throughout the day on Saturday and Sunday across the six side stages. The workshops, also known as "jams" or "sessions" involve four to five festival artists playing together on the same stage. Often centered around a theme, some workshops feature acts of similar style, while others may feature artists of different genres. Artists generally take turns playing on each other's songs, or improvising in a "jam" format.

Folk Boot Camp
In addition to the main festival on Prince's Island Park, the Calgary Folk Music Festival runs a series of three-day intensive workshops at the National Music Centre, taught by festival artists in such areas as songwriting, arranging, vocal techniques and guitar.  The three-day sessions allow the instructor and participants to develop their skills and receive constructive feedback from the instructor and peers.

Folk Boot Camp is geared towards musicians that have a basic grasp of their craft and want to supplement their own studies with guidance from some of the world's finest musicians.

Songwriting Contest
The Calgary Folk Music Festival also holds an annual songwriting context prior to the festival. The contest awards $20,000 of prizes in 5 songwriting categories to budding Alberta artists and many large and small concerts in venues around the city. 2016's Songwriting contest will be hosted exclusively by the Ship and Anchor pub.

Block Heater 
The Calgary Folk Music Festival also presents Block Heater, a winter music extravaganza held annually in February on the Music Mile in the historic community of Inglewood. The winter festival hosts over 20 local, national and international artists, concerts and collaborative songwriter-in-the-round sessions in the neighbourhood and throughout downtown Calgary. The 8th annual Block Heater music festival takes place February 9-12, 2023.

Festival Hall
Festival Hall is the Calgary Folk Music Festival's office and boutique performance space. The LEEDS Silver equivalent 200-seat flexible community space, designed by Peter Cardew Architects, includes geo-thermal passive heating and cooling systems, reclaimed materials and significant architectural details, such as the signature timbered ceiling. Festival Hall's overriding programming and vision will mirror the Festival's: to offer diverse, top-notch, innovative, collaborative programming and capture the sense of ownership that the audience and volunteers have towards the Festival. The Hall extends the Festival into a year-round operation as the host of year-round concerts, multi-media presentations, collaborations and workshops. It's also a meeting space for the Festival's 1800 volunteers, a community space for event rentals and a multi-purpose, multi-disciplinary home for Calgary's arts community. In 2022 Festival Hall celebrated its 10th anniversary, and has since become a significant central gathering place for artists to perform, collaborate and innovate that hosts artistic workshops, discussions, lectures, song contests, master classes and other presentations for a variety of community organizations and a wide range of artistic disciplines (film, theatre, media and literary arts, dance etc.).

See also

List of festivals in Calgary

References

External links
Calgary Folk Fest Web Page

Music festivals established in 1980
Music festivals in Calgary
Folk festivals in Canada